is a Japanese enka singer who made her professional debut in 1973. With a career nearing five decades, she is one of the most-recognized and successful enka singers in history.

Ishikawa is a popular contestant on the annual NHK Kōhaku Uta Gassen broadcast. Up till 2017, she has been invited to perform 40 times since 1977, the year she released her biggest hit, "Tsugaru Kaikyo-Fuyugeshiki". To date, she holds the record for the most appearances in the NHK Kōhaku Uta Gassen for a female artist. She has released over 100 albums (including compilation albums) and more than 120 singles, of which a few were not enka, but rock and jazz music instead. Another of her biggest hits, "Amagi-goe", which was released in 1986, won her many awards, and many believe that it was this song that made her an icon as an A-list enka singer.

Biography 
Ishikawa grew up during enka's heyday and went with her mother and grandmother to see Chiyoko Shimakura's performance. “I loved singing,” she recalls. Ishikawa won a singing contest in 1972 when she was only 14 years old and released her first single "Kakurenbo" (かくれんぼ) the next year. She finished her high school but didn't go to university, entering show business instead. Her biggest hit, "Tsugaru Kaikyō Fuyugeshiki", was released in 1977.

Major league baseball player Ichiro Suzuki of the Seattle Mariners chose Sayuri Ishikawa's "Amagi-goe" as an AT-BAT MUSIC of 2008 with "Ishin Denshin" and "Royal Chocolate Flush" of Misia. She re-recorded this song with Marty Friedman for Ichiro.

In 2010, Ishikawa release a rare, non-enka single, Baby Baby, a duet with rock singer Tamio Okuda.

In 2015, Ishikawa recorded "Chanto Iwanakya Aisanai", the ending theme of the Lupin the 3rd Part IV anime.

In July 2017, Tokyo Olympic 2020 organizers kicked off the countdown celebration to the Olympic by releasing a promotional theme song along with a summer dance. The song, with which the organizer is aiming to promote the Japanese summer festivals, is a new version of “Tokyo Gorin Ondo,” the theme song for the 1964 Summer Olympics, but with updated lyrics. It will be performed by Ishikawa, alongside Yūzō Kayama and Pistol Takehara.

On May 20, 2019, it was announced that Ishikawa would be awarded the 2019 Spring Purple Ribbon Medal of Honours (令和元年春の紫綬褒章) for her accomplishments.

Ishikawa married Kenji Baba in 1981, but the couple divorced in 1989. Their daughter, Saori, was born in 1984.

NHK Kōhaku Uta Gassen appearances 
Ishikawa's first Kōhaku Uta Gassen appearance was in 1977, four years after her debut and following the hit of her signature song "Tsugaru Kaikyo Fuyu-geshiki".

2017 marked her 40th appearance in total, and 36th consecutive year in the ever popular annual event, which is a record for a female artist.

She missed the 34th edition in 1983 as she was heavily pregnant, though she did attend the show and appeared as a guest, cheering the red (female) group.

Discography

Honors 
Medal with Purple Ribbon (2019)

Notes

References

External links 
 Official site
 Ishikawa's site by Teichiku
 
 

1958 births
Enka singers
Japanese women musicians
Japanese women singers
Living people
Musicians from Kumamoto Prefecture
People from Kumamoto
Recipients of the Medal with Purple Ribbon